Ahnaz (also Romanized as Ahanaz and Ehenz; also known as Āhang and Ahing) is a village in Qazqanchay Rural District, Arjomand District, Firuzkuh County, Tehran Province, Iran. At the 2006 census, it had a population of 485, with 124 families.

References 

Populated places in Firuzkuh County